Chariesthes interruptevitticollis is a species of beetle in the family Cerambycidae. It was described by Stephan von Breuning in 1960. It is known from Kenya.

References

Chariesthes
Beetles described in 1960